The Sepak Takraw League, often referred as STL, is a Malaysian men's professional league for sepak takraw, a sport native to Southeast Asia. The competition was established in 2014 by Sepak Takraw Association of Malaysia (STAM) (Bahasa Melayu: Persatuan Sepaktakraw Malaysia (PSM)) and Astro Group’s subsidiary, Asia Sports Ventures, to develop the sport and groom players for the Malaysia men's national sepak takraw team. Since 2016, it operates on a system of promotion and relegation between a top division called STL Premier and a second division called STL Division 1. A cup competition called STL Champions Cup was introduced in 2017, featuring the top teams from STL Premier and STL Division 1 as well as invitational sides from around Asia. All competitions under the league use the official International Sepaktakraw Federation (ISTAF) rules and regulation.

Since 2018, it has been administered by PSM and Astro Group under a different subsidiary, Astro Arena.

History

Origins 
Malaysian sepak takraw was on the decline due to a talent pool shortage in the 2010s, with only 29 players available for national team selection at one point. A professional sepak takraw league was mooted in 2013 after Astro and UFA Sports Asia launched Singapore-based Asia Sports Ventures to undertake the development and global commercialisation of sepak takraw. Numerous discussions were held involving stakeholders to form a league similar to the Takraw Thailand League (TTL), which has been running since 2002. STL was officially launched by then Malaysian Minister of Youth and Sports Khairy Jamaluddin and STAM president Ahmad Ismail in Putrajaya on 7 November 2014.

Foundation year 
In its first season, 128 teams from seven zones in Peninsular Malaysia such as Perak participated in preliminary rounds to qualify for the main competition. The best 16 teams were drawn into four groups, with the top two teams of each group progressing to the knockout stage. Hanelang A were the inaugural STL champions after beating PDRM D in the Grand Final on 18 January 2015 and took home a grand prize of RM20,000.

Professional era 
The competition immediately entered its professional era the following season as teams were consolidated and narrowed down to eight teams. After the 2015 season, in which ATM became its first professional-era champions, it underwent another major revamp by introducing a promotion and relegation system. The new format was well-received, with the viewership of STL hitting a new record of 5.6 million viewers in the 2016 season, improving from 4.8 million viewers a year earlier. STL Champions Cup was created the following year to promote the league outside Malaysia.

In 2018, STL played a huge role in helping Malaysia win a gold medal in sepak takraw at the Asian Games for the first time in 24 years, as the five players involved were from the league: Farhan Adam, Zulkifli Abdul Razak, Syahir Rosdi, Azlan Alias and Norhafizi Abdul Razak.

In 2019, the league was officially broadcast outside of Malaysia for the first time when Indonesian broadcaster TVRI covered STL Champions Cup.

Effects of the COVID-19 pandemic 
Due to the 2020 movement control order, the league was affected and three teams based in East Malaysia, namely Sabah Mountaineers, Sarawak Hunter and Labuan Drillers, did not participate in the 2020 season. Plans to hold the league around the country were also shelved with all STL Premier and STL Division 1 matches taking place at Titiwangsa Stadium, Kuala Lumpur, with no crowd in attendance. The season began in September 2020 but was halted indefinitely a month later, first due to players and team officials coming into close contact with a person tested positive for COVID-19 and then due to a new movement control order imposed in Selangor, Kuala Lumpur and Putrajaya. The season resumed again in December and concluded with the Kuala Lumpur Thunder winning their maiden STL Premier title. The Kuala Lumpur side then became only the second team to do a double by winning the STL Champions Cup.

Competition format

Regular season 
There are currently 10 clubs in STL Premier. During the course of a season, the clubs play each other twice (a double round-robin system) for 18 games. The teams receive two points for a win and zero points for a loss. Teams are ranked by total points, then set difference and then point difference. As of the 2020 season, the top six teams qualify for STL Champions Cup. The two lowest placed teams are relegated to STL Division 1, and the top two teams from STL Division 1 are promoted in their place.

For STL Division 1, there are currently eight clubs, who play each other once (a round-robin system). Starting with the 2020 season, teams are divided into two groups with the top two of each group progress to a promotion playoff stage. Since 2020, the two teams that reach the promotion playoff final are promoted to STL Premier and qualify for STL Champions Cup.

STL Champions Cup 
Since its inception in 2017, the top teams from STL Premier and STL Division 1 as well as several foreign teams compete in this post-season tournament. However, there were no foreign teams in 2018 for unknown reasons. The 2020 tournament was held without any foreign team for the second team, due to the COVID-19 pandemic.

Sponsorship

Champions

STL (Amateur Era)

STL Premier

STL Division 1 

*Selangor Pistons were promoted instead of PSM Mavericks (then known as PSM A)

STL Champions Cup

Clubs

Current 
*As of the 2021 season

Former

Name changes

International clubs

Awards

STL Premier

STL Division 1

STL Champions Cup

Media coverage

References

External links 
 Official website (in Bahasa Melayu)
 Official Facebook page
 Official YouTube channel

Sports competitions in Malaysia
Sepak takraw competitions